Gelechia haifella is a moth of the family Gelechiidae. It is found in Palestine.

References

Moths described in 1935
Gelechia